Miki Imai is the name of:

, Japanese pop singer and actress
 Miki Imai (athlete) (born 1975), Japanese high jumper